Muchnik or Muchnick is a surname, and may refer to:

 Albert Muchnik, Russian mathematician and logician
 Alexander Muchnik, Ukrainian lawyer, human rights activist and journalist 
 Avi Muchnick, artist, author, programmer and entrepreneur
 Irvin Muchnick, American writer and first-named respondent in the Supreme Court case Reed Elsevier, Inc. v. Muchnick
 Isadore H. Y. Muchnick (1908–1963), Boston City Councilman and School Committee member
 Laurie Muchnick, fiction editor at Kirkus Reviews 
 Michoel Muchnik, American artist
 Sam Muchnick (1905–1998), American wrestling promoter
 Steven Muchnick, computer scientist

 Related surnames
 Muchnic